When I'm a Moth is a 2019 American independent drama film directed by Zachary Cotler and Magdalena Zyzak and starring Addison Timlin as Hillary Clinton.  The film depicts Clinton, then going by her birth name of Hillary Rodham, at a period of her life in 1969 when she worked in Alaska after graduating from Wellesley College.  Cotler has stated that the film is "not a biopic".

Cast
Addison Timlin as Hillary Rodham
TJ Kayama as Ryohei
Toshiji Takeshima as Mitsuru

Release
The film was released, after a delay during the pandemic, by Dark Star Pictures on Aug 27, 2021. The film's world premiere was on April 12, 2019 at the San Francisco Film Festival.

Production
Production began in October 2016.  It was confirmed in March 2017 that filming had been completed.

Reception
The film received polarized reviews, attracting praise from independent critics, and largely negative responses from more mainstream sources.

Several critics questioned the premise of the film, with Caryn James at Hollywood Reporter calling the movie "pointless." Other critics disagreed, with reviewers at Hammer to Nail and Screen-Space considering the film an "experiment" and an attempt to analyse how Hillary Clinton is seen in America respectively.

Some critics liked the script, others considered it "pretentious." Nonetheless the cinematography was largely praised, with Film Threat calling it "beautiful." The "atmosphere" created was considered a highlight by Less Hat, Moorhead and Movie Nation. Addison Timlin's performance was also largely praised, although this opinion was not universally shared.

References

External links
 

2019 films
American drama films
Films set in Alaska
Films set in 1969
American independent films
2010s English-language films
2010s Japanese-language films
Works about Hillary Clinton
2010s American films